Michael Moriarty  is a British historian of French and French literature, currently the Drapers Professor at University of Cambridge and also fellow of the British Academy.

References

Year of birth missing (living people)
Living people
Academics of the University of Cambridge
British historians
Fellows of the British Academy